Maniyan Pilla Adhava Maniyan Pilla is a 1981 Indian Malayalam-language comedy film written, directed and scripted by Balachandra Menon. The film stars Sudheer Kumar (Maniyanpilla Raju), Venu Nagavally, Jose Prakash and Ambika. The film revolves around Maniyanpilla, an illiterate man from a poor household, who goes to the city to make a living. The film was produced and distributed by E. J. Peter under the banner of St. Martin Films. The producer had signed Kamal Haasan for the film as the lead actor, but due to circumstances, Menon replaced Haasan with his real life friend Sudheer Kumar as the lead actor. The film has a musical score by G. Devarajan. The cinematography was handled by Ramachandra Babu. The film was release on 1 May 1981 and was a commercial success and was a breakthrough for Sudheer Kumar, who adopted the hypocorism Maniyanpilla Raju after the success of the film.

Premise
An innocent, illiterate man from a poor family gets a job in an urban bungalow where he finds the people vile. He has to face a lot of obstacles in the wicked world.

Cast
 
Maniyanpilla Raju as Maniyan Pilla 
Venu Nagavally as Rahim 
Jose Prakash 
Ambika 
Nanditha Bose
Nithya
Sankaradi
Adoor Bhavani
Balachandra Menon
P. A. Latheef
Jayashree
Kaviyoor Ponnamma

Soundtrack
The music was composed by G. Devarajan.

References

External links
  
 

1981 films
1980s Malayalam-language films